Abraham X. Parker (November 14, 1831 – August 9, 1909) was an American lawyer and politician from New York. He was most notable for his service in the New York State Assembly (1863-1864), the New York State Senate (1867-1871), and the United States House of Representatives (1881-1889).

Life
Parker was born in Granville, Vermont on November 14, 1831. He attended St. Lawrence Academy in Potsdam, New York and studied law with Henry L. Knowles. He then attended lectures at Albany Law School to complete his legal training, and was admitted to the bar in 1854.

After becoming an attorney, Parker practiced in Buffalo with the firm of Eli Cook and Freeman J. Fithian.  He then practiced briefly in Syracuse before returning to Potsdam in 1856 to establish a firm in partnership with John G. McIntyre.

He was a member of the New York State Assembly (St. Lawrence Co., 3rd D.) in 1863 and 1864. Parker served as chairman of the Committee on Claims in his first term, and the committee on Commerce and Navigation in his second.

He was Postmaster of Potsdam from 1865 to 1866, and also served as a justice of the peace and as president of the Village of Potsdam. He was a member of the New York State Senate from 1868 to 1871. In the Senate, Parker served as chairman of the Committee on Insurance and Public Health. In 1876, Parker was a candidate to be one of New York's presidential electors, but Democratic nominee Samuel Tilden carried the state and received its electoral votes.
 
Parker was elected as a Republican to the 47th and to the three succeeding Congresses (March 4, 1881 – March 3, 1889). He was appointed by President Grover Cleveland as a member of the first labor investigation commission. He served as a delegate to the 1892 Republican National Convention and as First Assistant Attorney General from September 8, 1890 to March 4, 1893.

After leaving the Justice Department, Parker resumed the practice of law in Potsdam. A civic activist, he was the longtime chief engineer of Potsdam's volunteer fire department and a trustee of St. Lawrence Academy. In addition, he served as He served as president of the board of trustees for the Thomas S. Clarkson Memorial School of Technology and a member of the board of managers for the State Normal School in Potsdam.

Parker died in Potsdam on August 9, 1909.  He was interred at Bayside Cemetery in Potsdam.

Family
In 1857, Parker married Jenny Wright (1836-1919).  Their children included Mabel, Thurlow, Jennie, Kittie, Harriet (Hattie), Alice and Bessie.

References

Sources

Books

Magazines

External links

Abraham X. Parker at The Political Graveyard

1831 births
1909 deaths
Albany Law School alumni
Republican Party members of the New York State Assembly
Republican Party New York (state) state senators
People from Potsdam, New York
United States Assistant Attorneys General
Republican Party members of the United States House of Representatives from New York (state)
People from Granville, Vermont
New York (state) postmasters
19th-century American politicians